The Night Bird is a 1928 American silent comedy film directed by Fred C. Newmeyer and starring Reginald Denny, Corliss Palmer and Sam Hardy.

Synopsis
A New York boxer falls in love with an Italian girl he meets in Central Park. However his manager tries to prevent a relationship developing for fears of its impact on his career.

Cast
 Reginald Denny as Kid Davis  
 Betsy Lee  as Madelena  
 Sam Hardy as Gleason  
 Harvey Clark as Silsburg  
 Corliss Palmer as Blonde  
 Jocelyn Lee as Redhead  
 Alphonse Martell as Pete  
 George Bookasta as Joe  
 Michael Visaroff as Mario  
 Adele Watson as Maid

References

Bibliography
 Munden, Kenneth White. The American Film Institute Catalog of Motion Pictures Produced in the United States, Part 1. University of California Press, 1997.

External links

1928 films
1928 comedy films
Silent American comedy films
Films directed by Fred C. Newmeyer
American silent feature films
1920s English-language films
Universal Pictures films
American boxing films
American black-and-white films
1920s American films